Captain Tania Shergill is the first Indian woman Parade Adjutant to lead an all-man contingent at an Army Day function in Indian Army, Republic Day (India) in 2020.

Early life and education
She is a graduate of Officers Training Academy (OTA) in Chennai. Shergill is serving at 1-Signal Training Centre in Jabalpur. She was commissioned into the Indian Army Corps of Signals in 2017.

Family background 
Shergill belongs to an Indian Army family background where her father served the 101 Medium Regiment (Artillery) and later in CRPF where he won a PPMG. Shergill's grandfather served in the 14th Armoured Regiment (Scinde Horse). Her great grandfather was in the Sikh Regiment. Shergill also lead the Army's contingent during the Republic Day parade in 2021.

Education 
Shergill holds a B.Tech degree in electronics and telecommunications from Nagpur University.

Appreciation 
 A video of Tania's Parade was shared by business tycoon Anand Mahindra on Social Media captioning 'This should trend'
Amitabh Bacchan shared a post on Twitter congratulating Shergill and captioned the post ". the pride of India .. Capt Tanya Shergill .. what a moment .. !"

Interviews 
INTERVIEW | You grow so much as a person in the army: Captain Tania ShergillVideo interview with Doordarshan National| An interview with Capt. Tania Shergill

References

Living people
Indian Army personnel
Rashtrasant Tukadoji Maharaj Nagpur University alumni
1993 births